Tony Sund (born 4 August 1995) is a Finnish professional ice hockey defenceman for Rögle BK of the Swedish Hockey League (SHL). Internationally, he represented the Finnish national team.

He was signed as an undrafted free agent by the San Jose Sharks on 9 May 2019, and represented Finland at the 2021 IIHF World Championship.

On 3 March 2023, Sund's NHL rights were traded to the Montreal Canadiens in a three-team trade.

References

External links
 

1995 births
Living people
Dinamo Riga players
Finnish expatriate ice hockey players in Latvia
Finnish expatriate ice hockey players in Switzerland
Finnish ice hockey defencemen
HC Davos players
HC TPS players
Kokkolan Hermes players
People from Pedersöre
Rögle BK players
SaPKo players
Sportspeople from Ostrobothnia (region)
Swedish-speaking Finns
Vaasan Sport players